Crocanthemum scoparium is a species of rockrose which is endemic to California. Its common names include peak rockrose and peak rushrose. One variety is known as Bisbee Peak rushrose.

It is found in dry, sandy areas in hills and low mountains.

Description
Crocanthemum scoparium is a small perennial shrub bearing long, smooth stems and small flowers each with five bright yellow petals.

References

External links
Jepson eFlora: Crocanthemum scoparium
Jepson Manual Treatment of Helianthemum scoparium
Helianthemum scoparium — Photo gallery

Cistaceae
Endemic flora of California
Flora of the Sierra Nevada (United States)
Natural history of the California chaparral and woodlands
Natural history of the California Coast Ranges
Natural history of the Central Valley (California)
Natural history of the Channel Islands of California
Natural history of the Peninsular Ranges
Natural history of the San Francisco Bay Area
Natural history of the Santa Monica Mountains
Natural history of the Transverse Ranges
Flora without expected TNC conservation status